Korablino is a town and the administrative center of Korablinsky District in Ryazan Oblast, Russia, located  south of Ryazan, the administrative center of the oblast. Population:

History
It was founded in 1676 and granted town status in 1965.

Administrative and municipal status
Within the framework of administrative divisions, Korablino serves as the administrative center of Korablinsky District. As an administrative division, it is incorporated within Korablinsky District as the town of district significance of Korablino. As a municipal division, the town of district significance of Korablino is incorporated within Korablinsky Municipal District as Korablinskoye Urban Settlement.

References

Notes

Sources

Cities and towns in Ryazan Oblast
Populated places established in 1676
1676 establishments in Russia
Ryazhsky Uyezd